The Garden of Resurrection is a 1919 British silent drama film directed by Arthur Rooke and starring Guy Newall, Ivy Duke and Franklin Dyall. It was adapted from the 1911 novel The Garden of Resurrection by E. Temple Thurston.

Cast
 Guy Newall as Bellairs 
 Ivy Duke as Clarissa 
 Franklin Dyall as Cruickshank 
 Mary Dibley as Belwottle 
 Douglas Munro as Moxon 
 Lawford Davidson as Fennell 
 Hugh Buckler as Dr. Perowne 
 Humberston Wright as General French 
 Madge Tree as Aunt

References

External links

1919 films
1919 drama films
British silent feature films
British drama films
Films directed by Arthur Rooke
Films based on Irish novels
British black-and-white films
1910s English-language films
1910s British films
Silent drama films